Rhode Island elected its members August 25, 1818.

See also 
 1818 and 1819 United States House of Representatives elections
 List of United States representatives from Rhode Island

1818
Rhode Island
United States House of Representatives